Bertha of Swabia (AD – after January 2, 966), a member of the Alemannic Hunfriding dynasty, was queen of Burgundy from 922 until 937 and queen of Italy from 922 until 926, by her marriage with King Rudolph II. She was again queen of Italy during her second marriage with King Hugh from 937 until his death in 948.

Life
Bertha was the daughter of Duke Burchard II of Swabia and his wife Regelinda. In 922, she was married to the Burgundian king Rudolph II. The Welf rulers of Upper Burgundy had campaigned the adjacent Swabian Thurgau region several times, and the marriage was meant as a gesture of reconciliation. With her husband Rudolph, Bertha founded the church of Amsoldingen.

Rudolph died in 937, whereupon Bertha married King Hugh of Italy in what is today Colombier on 12 December 937. This marriage was not a happy one; when Hugh died in 947, Bertha returned to Burgundy.

Between 950 and 960, Bertha founded Payerne Priory, where she was buried. Up to today she is venerated as "Good Queen Bertha" (La reine Berthe) in the Swiss Romandy region, mainly in Vaud, and numerous myths and legends have evolved about her life.

Issue
Bertha and Rudolph had:
Adelaide of Italy, who became Holy Roman Empress as consort of Emperor Otto I
Conrad succeeded as King of Burgundy upon his father's death in 937

References

Sources

External links
  Legend associated with the Queen Bertha (archived 28 September 2007)
 

900s births
10th-century births
Italian queens consort
Burgundian queens consort
Queens consort of Lower Burgundy
Remarried royal consorts
German duchesses
10th-century Italian women
10th-century deaths
Queen mothers